James E. Lance (April 21, 1931 – February 25, 2016) was an American football coach. He was the 16th head football coach at Kansas State Teachers College—now known as Emporia State University—in Emporia, Kansas, serving for two seasons, from 1969 to 1970, and compiling a record of record of 7–11.

Lance was born April 21, 1931, in Evansville, Indiana. After serving in the United States Navy during the Korean War, Lance graduated from Murray State University in 1959 with a Bachelor of Science. He earned a master's degree in education from the University of Mississippi in 1974, and a Ph.D. in physiology from the University of Southern Mississippi in 1974. Lance died on February 25, 2016, after suffering from Parkinson's disease.

Head coaching record

References

1931 births
2016 deaths
Emporia State Hornets football coaches
Murray State Racers football players
Texas A&M–Kingsville Javelinas football coaches
High school football coaches in Florida
Emporia State University faculty
Texas A&M University–Kingsville faculty
University of Mississippi alumni
University of Southern Mississippi alumni
United States Navy personnel of the Korean War
Sportspeople from Evansville, Indiana
Players of American football from Indiana
Neurological disease deaths in the United States
Deaths from Parkinson's disease